Miamira flavicostata is a species of sea slug or dorid nudibranch, a marine gastropod mollusk in the family Chromodorididae.

Distribution 
This species was described from Japan. It is reported from Indonesia and eastern Australia.

Description
The colouration of this nudibranch is flamboyant, principally with a purple background, orange ridges on the back and yellow spots on the foot.

References

Chromodorididae
Gastropods described in 1940